In mathematics, a surface bundle is a bundle in which the fiber is a surface.  When the base space is a circle the total space is three-dimensional and is often called a surface bundle over the circle.

See also
Mapping torus

Geometric topology